The following is a list of all the squads of the national teams that participated in the 2019 FIFA U-17 World Cup.

Each team had to name a squad of 21 players (three of whom had to be goalkeepers) by the FIFA deadline. All players of its representative team had to have been born on or after 1 January 2002. The age listed for each player is on 26 October 2019, the first day of the tournament. Those marked in bold have been capped with the senior national team.

Group A

Brazil
Brazil named their squad on 20 September 2019.

Head coach: Guilherme Dalla Déa

Canada
Head coach: Andrew Olivieri

Angola

Head coach:  Pedro Gonçalves

New Zealand
New Zealand announced their squad on 23 September 2019.

Head coach:  José Figueira

Group B

Nigeria
Nigeria announced a squad of 25 players on 10 October 2019, which was reduced to 21 on 16 October.

Head coach: Manu Garba

Hungary
Hungary announced a squad of 23 players the 10 October 2019, which was reduced to 21 on 16 October.

Head coach: Sandor Preisinger

Ecuador
Head coach: José Javier Rodríguez Mayorga

Australia
Australia named their squad on 2 October 2019.

Head coach: Trevor Morgan

Group C

South Korea
South Korea named their squad on 1 October 2019.

Head coach: Kim Jung-soo

Haiti

Head coach:  Miguel Perdomo

France
France announced their squad on 7 October 2019.

Head coach: Jean-Claude Giuntini

Chile

Head coach: Cristian Leiva

Group D

United States
The United States announced their squad on 11 October 2019.

Head coach:  Raphaël Wicky

Senegal

Head coach: Malick Daf

Japan
Japan named their squad on 4 October 2019.

Head coach: Yoshiro Moriyama

Netherlands
Netherlands announced a squad of 21 players on the 16 October 2019.

Head coach: Peter van der Veen

Group E

Spain
Spain announced their squad on 9 October 2019.

Head coach: Juan David Gordo

Argentina

Head coach: Pablo Aimar

Tajikistan

Head coach: Zainidin Rahimov

Cameroon

Head coach: Thomas Libiih

Group F

Solomon Islands
Solomon Islands named their squad on 30 September 2019.

Head coach: Stanley Waita

Italy
Italy announced its official squad of 21 players on 16 October 2019.

Head coach: *

Paraguay

Head coach: Gustavo Morínigo

Mexico
Mexico named their squad on 8 October 2019.

Head coach: Marco Antonio Ruiz

References

External links
 2019 U17 FIFA World Cup: List of Players

FIFA U-17 World Cup squads
squads